The concert overture Carnival, Op. 92, B. 169, was written by Antonín Dvořák in 1891. It is part of a "Nature, Life and Love" trilogy of overtures, forming the second part, "Life". The other two parts are In Nature's Realm, Op. 91 ("Nature") and Othello, Op. 93 ("Love").

The overture, in A major, is scored for two flutes, piccolo, two oboes, English horn, two clarinets, two bassoons, four horns, two trumpets, three trombones, tuba, timpani, triangle, cymbals, tambourine, harp and strings. Its duration is between 9½ and 11½ minutes.

Discography
 Dvořák in Prague: A Celebration, Boston Symphony Orchestra, Seiji Ozawa, Sony CD (1994) and Kultur DVD (2007)

References

External links

Carnival Overture, Op. 92. Dr. Richard E. Rodda. The Kennedy Center.
 

Compositions by Antonín Dvořák
Concert overtures
1891 compositions
Compositions in A major